Francesco Maria della Rovere may refer to the following members of the Della Rovere dynasty:
Francesco Maria I della Rovere, duke of Urbino
Francesco Maria II della Rovere, duke of Urbino